Thladiantha is a genus of flowering plants in the family Cucurbitaceae, native to the Indian subcontinent, Southeast Asia, and China. They are dioecious, perennial herbs. The best known species is Thladiantha dubia.

Species
Species currently accepted by The Plant List are as follows: 
Thladiantha africana C. Jeffrey → Siraitia africana (C.Jeffrey) A.M.Lu & Zhi Y.Zhang
Thladiantha capitata Cogn. 
Thladiantha cordifolia (Blume) Cogn. 
Thladiantha davidii Franch. 
Thladiantha dentata Cogn. 
Thladiantha dimorphantha Hand.-Mazz. 
Thladiantha dubia Bunge 
Thladiantha grandisepala A.M. Lu & Zhi Y. Zhang 
Thladiantha henryi Hemsl. 
Thladiantha hookeri C.B.Clarke 
Thladiantha indochinensis Merr. 
Thladiantha lijiangensis A.M. Lu & Zhi Y. Zhang 
Thladiantha longifolia Cogn. ex Oliv. 
Thladiantha longisepala C.Y. Wu 
Thladiantha maculata Cogn. 
Thladiantha medogensis A.M. Lu & J.Q. Li 
Thladiantha montana Cogn. 
Thladiantha nudiflora Hemsl. 
Thladiantha oliveri Cogn. ex Mottet 
Thladiantha palmatipartita A.M. Lu & C. Jeffrey 
Thladiantha punctata Hayata 
Thladiantha pustulata (H. Lév.) C. Jeffrey ex A.M. Lu & Zhi Y. Zhang 
Thladiantha sessilifolia Hand.-Mazz. 
Thladiantha setispina A.M. Lu & Zhi Y. Zhang 
Thladiantha tomentosa (A.M. Lu & Zhi Y. Zhang) W. Jiang & H. Wang 
Thladiantha villosula Cogn.

References

Cucurbitaceae genera
Plants described in 1833
Cucurbitoideae
Dioecious plants
Taxa named by Alexander von Bunge